Crustomastix is a genus of green algae in the class Mamiellophyceae.

References

External links

Mamiellophyceae
Chlorophyta genera